Gopala-puram is a village in West Godavari district of the Indian state of Andhra Pradesh. It is the headquarters of Gopalapuram mandal. The nearest train station is kovvuru located at a distance of 28 Km.

Demographics 

 Census of India, Gopalapuram had a population of 11573. The total population constitute, 5469 males and 6104 females with a sex ratio of 1116 females per 1000 males. 1084 children are in the age group of 0–6 years, with sex ratio of 1061. The average literacy rate is at 74.83%.

References 

Villages in West Godavari district